Lori E. Carson (born March 2, 1958) is an American singer-songwriter whose albums include Shelter (1990), Where it Goes (1995), Everything I Touch Runs Wild (1997) and Another Year (2012). A former member of the seminal band The Golden Palominos, she has contributed to soundtracks including Bernardo Bertolucci's Stealing Beauty, Kathryn Bigelow's Strange Days, and Keith Gordon's Waking the Dead.

Her debut novel, The Original 1982, was published by William Morrow/HarperCollins in June 2013.

Career history
Carson began performing in the mid-eighties at Folk City, The Bitter End, and other clubs on or around Bleecker Street. She was signed to a development deal with Manhattan Records in 1987, and to a recording contract with Geffen Records in 1988.

Shelter, produced by Hal Willner, was released in 1990 to excellent reviews. It featured a duet with Gregg Allman. In support of the record, Carson toured as part of a trio (Rachelle Garnier on accordion and Paul Pimsler on guitar) opening for Joe Jackson in Canada and the U.S. In 1991, she was dropped from the label.

Playing a show in New York City later that year, Carson was approached by drummer/producer Anton Fier to collaborate on a new project that became 1992's This is How it Feels by The Golden Palominos. Pure by the Palominos was released the following year and featured Carson's song "Little Suicides".

Carson signed to Restless records in 1994, and Where it Goes (produced by Fier) was released in 1995. She toured extensively in support of the record, often accompanied by Paul Pimsler and cellist Jane Scarpantoni. Solo, she opened for Counting Crows, facing their hit-hungry audiences with only an acoustic guitar. On tour in Asia, she learned that Bernardo Bertolucci wanted to license "You Won't Fall" for his film Stealing Beauty. She received an offer to co-write a song for Kathryn Bigelow's Strange Days with composer Graeme Revell.

Everything I Touch Runs Wild was released in 1997. Recorded in her New York City apartment, the record received great press. It made many top ten lists nationally and was named Record of the Year by the Long Island Village Voice.

In 1998, Carson moved from New York City to Seattle and recorded Stars with Layng Martine III and Joe Ferla co-producing. Released in 1999, it was her last record for Restless.

House in the Weeds, a lo-fi, limited edition of only two thousand copies, was made available in 2001. Rykodisc released Stolen Beauty, a compilation of Carson's film and TV contributions that year as well.

In 2002 Janet Rienstra of Meta Records asked Carson to compose a song-cycle that would work in the context of yoga or meditation. The Finest Thing was the result. Released by Meta in 2004, it was featured by NPR that summer on Echoes. One Little Indian picked it up for release in Europe in 2005.

Carson's most recent record is Another Year (Blue Kitchen Music/ United for Opportunity, 2012). In June 2013 her debut novel, The Original 1982, was published by William Morrow/HarperCollins. In 2016 Carson cofounded the small press 3 a.m. analog to publish "fiction and creative nonfiction of musicians and songwriters" including Jesse Harris, Matt Keating (musician), and Sylvie Simmons.

Personal life
Carson was born in Queens, New York and grew up in Bethpage. She has a younger brother and sister. Her mother, Edith, was a schoolteacher. Her father, Marvin, now deceased, was an engineer who went to work on Wall Street.

Carson graduated from Plainedge High School in North Massapequa, was a Fine Arts major at FIT in New York City, and attended Hunter College.

She was briefly romantically involved with her Golden Palominos bandmate Anton Fier in the 1990s.

Discography
1990 – Shelter (DGC – Geffen)
1992 – This Is How It Feels – Golden Palominos (Restless Records)
1993 – Pure – Golden Palominos (Restless)
1995 – Where It Goes (Restless)
1995 – Strange Days (soundtrack) – "Fall in the Light" with Graeme Revell
1996 – Myths of The World (compilation – Rienstra/Laswell)
1997 – Everything I Touch Runs Wild (Restless)
1999 – Intonarumori – All That Future (with Bernie Worrell) – Bill Laswell/Material (Palm)
1999 – Stars (Restless)
2001 – House in the Weeds (self-released)
2001 – Stolen Beauty (compilation – Rykodisc)
2001 – Crazy/Beautiful – "I Want to Believe You" with Paul Haslinger (soundtrack)
2001 – The Bellwether Project – Slang
2002 – More Talk About Tonight – Slang
2003 – Strong Currents – "In the Middle of the Night" with Hector Zazou (compilation)
2004 – The Finest Thing (Meta Records)
2012 – Another Year (Blue Kitchen/United for Opportunity)

Soundtrack appearances
Strange Days – 1995
Stealing Beauty – 1996
Keys to Tulsa – 1997
Grind – 1997
Niagara, Niagara – 1997
Broken Vessels – 1998
Simply Irresistible – 1999
Waking the Dead – 2000
Crazy/Beautiful – 2001
Blue Car – 2002
Pizza My Heart – 2005

References

External links
 Lori Carson home page
 

1958 births
Living people
20th-century American women singers
21st-century American women singers
American alternative country singers
American country singer-songwriters
American women country singers
American women singer-songwriters
The Golden Palominos members
People from Bethpage, New York
People from North Massapequa, New York
People from Queens, New York
Country musicians from New York (state)
Singer-songwriters from New York (state)
Trip hop musicians
Restless Records artists
20th-century American singers
21st-century American singers